The 48th Massachusetts General Court, consisting of the Massachusetts Senate and the Massachusetts House of Representatives, met in 1827 and 1828 during the governorship of Levi Lincoln Jr. John Mills served as president of the Senate and William C. Jarvis served as speaker of the House.

Committees
 Joint committees: Accounts; Banks, Banking and Insurance; Bridges; Claims; Fisheries; Library; Manufactures; Militia; Parishes and Religious Societies; Public Lands; Roads and Canals; Towns.

Senators

Representatives

See also
 20th United States Congress
 List of Massachusetts General Courts

References

Further reading

External links
 
 
 
 

Political history of Massachusetts
Massachusetts legislative sessions
massachusetts
1827 in Massachusetts
massachusetts
1828 in Massachusetts